Miss Universe Great Britain 2009, 4th Miss Universe United Kingdom pageant, was held at ICC Hall 4, Broad Street, Birmingham, United Kingdom on 3 May 2009. Lisa Lazarus of Llanelli crowned her successor Clair Cooper of Greater London at the end of the event. That year only 40 candidates competed for the national crown.

Results

Special Awards

Contestants

Judges
Lizzie Cundy
Amy Guy
Nick Knowles
Sue Moxley
Rachel Rice

Trivia 
Miss Greater London had represented England in Miss Earth 2007 and was a finalist in Miss England 2006.
Miss National Capital had been a runner up in Nigeria's Next Top Model

Notes

Withdrawals
 - From this point forward Northern Ireland is no longer allowed to compete in the pageant as the pageant now only allows representatives from England, Scotland and Wales.

External links
Official Website

2009
2009 beauty pageants
2009 in the United Kingdom
Events in Birmingham, West Midlands